Pete Wells is the restaurant critic for The New York Times. He has held the position since November 2011, succeeding Sam Sifton.

Wells was adopted as an infant and grew up in Rhode Island. He lives in Brooklyn and is married to the novelist Susan Choi; they met while working for The New Yorker.
 
From 1999 to 2001, Wells was a columnist and editor for Food & Wine. Wells was articles editors at Details from 2001 until 2006, when he joined the Times as dining editor. Wells is the recipient of five James Beard awards for food writing.

Wells's caustic 14 November 2012 review of Guy Fieri's American Kitchen and Bar, which consisted entirely of questions about the poor quality of the food, was described by Larry Olmsted of Forbes as "the most scathing review in the history of the New York Times," and "likely the most widely read restaurant review ever." It was the fifth-most-e-mailed New York Times article of 2012. His 2016 review of Per Se, downgrading the restaurant from 4 stars to 2 stars, also attracted wide attention, with an Esquire headline stating: “Why That Per Se Review May Change Fine Dining Forever.” He also attracted considerable attention for his October 29, 2019 zero-star review of Peter Luger Steak House.

References

The New York Times columnists
Living people
Year of birth missing (living people)
Critics employed by The New York Times
American restaurant critics
American male non-fiction writers
James Beard Foundation Award winners
Writers from Brooklyn
Writers from Rhode Island